Diver organisations are membership based organisations where the membership is wholly, or at least in large part, underwater divers, and the organisation is intended to further a mutual interest related to underwater diving or the aquatic environment as it affects divers or diving activity. Some organisations have more than one focus of interest.

Freediving

Recreational and technical scuba

Scientific, archeological and historical

Underwater sports

Other

References 

Diver organizations